A nonfuture tense (abbreviated ) is a grammatical tense that distinguishes a verbal action as having taken place in times past or times present, as opposed to a future tense. Nonfuture tense is found in a languages such as Rukai, Greenlandic, Quechua, Yabem and Nivkh.

References

Grammatical tenses